Johnny Tahu Cooper (23 July 1929 – 3 September 2014), also known as The Maori Cowboy, was a pioneering New Zealand rock and roll musician and entrepreneur. His cover of "Rock Around the Clock", a song popularised by Bill Haley & His Comets, is considered to be the first rock and roll song recorded in New Zealand. His 1955 single, "Pie Cart Rock 'n' Roll", was the first original rock song recorded and released in New Zealand. His song, "Look What You've Done", was covered by Johnny Devlin and became a national favourite, appearing in the 1994 film Once Were Warriors.

References 

1929 births
2014 deaths
20th-century New Zealand musicians
Rock and roll musicians
New Zealand Māori singers